Islandia may refer to:

 Iceland, Latin name for "Iceland"
 Islandia, a 1942 novel by Austin Tappan Wright
 Islandia, a 1983 video game by Julian Gollop
 Islandia, Florida, a community in the United States
 Islandia, New York, a village in the United States